Leutra is a small river in Thuringia, Germany. It flows into the Saale in the village Maua, in the southern part of Jena. Another small river also named Leutra flows into the Saale in the centre of Jena, 6 km to the north.

The valley through which the Leutra flows is part of an important nature reserve, called Naturschutzgebiet Leutratal und Cospoth, maintained by Naturschutzbund Deutschland.

During the Nazi era a motorway (the A4) was built through the valley, but Angela Merkel's government had a road tunnel built (Jagdbergtunnel) to increase the capacity of the Autobahn while reducing the impact of the road on the nature reserve.

See also
List of rivers of Thuringia

References

Rivers of Thuringia
Rivers of Germany